Stuart Cage (born 16 July 1973) is an English professional golfer.

Cage won the English Amateur in 1992 and played for Great Britain & Ireland in the 1993 Walker Cup. He turned professional in 1993 and having finished 8th on the second tier Challenge Tour Rankings the following year, was a rookie on the European Tour in 1995. He nearly won the Irish Open during that first season, losing out to the experienced Sam Torrance to a playoff. Two years later he won his only European Tour title, at the Europe 1 Cannes Open. However from 1998 onwards he struggled and he last played on the main European Tour in 2003.

Amateur wins
1992 English Amateur, Lytham Trophy

Professional wins (3)

European Tour wins (1)

European Tour playoff record (0–1)

Challenge Tour wins (1)

PGA EuroPro Tour wins (1)

Results in major championships

CUT = missed the halfway cut
Note: Cage only played in The Open Championship.

Team appearances
Amateur
European Boys' Team Championship (representing England): 1991
Jacques Léglise Trophy (representing Great Britain & Ireland): 1991 (winners)
European Amateur Team Championship (representing England): 1993
Walker Cup (representing Great Britain & Ireland): 1993

References

External links

English male golfers
European Tour golfers
Sportspeople from Leeds
1973 births
Living people